Athili Sattibabu LKG is a 2007 Telugu comedy film starring Allari Naresh and Kausha Rach, directed by E. V. V. Satyanarayana. Allari Naresh played a Pawnbroker in the film, while Raghu Babu and Sunil played his wayward brothers.

Plot

Athili Sathibabu (Allari Naresh), a ruthless moneylender who charges exorbitant rates of interest and fleeces people realises the value of love and relationship after falling in love with a beautician (Kausha).The rest of the film is all about what happens next and how Sattibabu mends his ways.

Cast

 Allari Naresh as Athili Sathibabu
  Vidisha as Ammulu
 Kausha Rach as Pranathi
 Brahmanandam
 Sunil as Athili Sathibabu's brother
 Venu Madhav
 Dharmavarapu Subramanyam
 Ali
 Babu Mohan
 Krishna Bhagawan
 M. S. Narayana
 Mallikarjuna Rao
 Chalapati Rao
 L. B. Sriram
 Raghu Babu as Athili Sathibabu's brother
 Kondavalasa
 Chittajalu Lakshmipati
 Kadambari Kirankumar
 Duvvasi Mohan
 Srinivasa Reddy
 Uttej
 Kallu Krishna Rao
 Gundu Sudharshan
 Maharshi Raghava
 Uma Devi as a sex worker
 Kakinada Malli
 Lathasri
 Abhinayashree
 Satya Krishna
 Bhargavi
 Aruna
 Archana
 S. L. Bhargavi
 Mounika

Soundtrack
The music was composed by Sri Krishna and released by Aditya Music. The song "Shake Break" was heavily inspired by "Get Busy" by Sean Paul.

Filming
The first schedule was held from 1 to 25 January 2007 at Ramoji Film City, Hyderabad. The penultimate 4-day schedule took place in January-end in Hyderabad, followed by a major schedule, from 1 to 25 February, in Rajahmundry. Of the five songs in the film, one was shot on sets, one in Rajahmundry and three of them abroad.

Release
This movie was released on 6 April 2007.

Box office
The film fared moderately at the box office.

References

External links
 
 Athili Sattibabu Picture Gallery
 Movie's working stills

2007 films
2000s Telugu-language films
Films directed by E. V. V. Satyanarayana
Indian comedy-drama films
2007 comedy-drama films
Films shot at Ramoji Film City